The Ngalia, or Ngalea, are an Aboriginal Australian people of the Western Desert cultural bloc resident in land extending from Western Australia to the west of South Australia. They are not to be confused with the Ngalia of the Northern Territory.

Country
The Ngalia's traditional lands are around the salt lake areas, such as the Serpentine Lakes in the Great Victoria Desert, northwest of Ooldea, South Australia, in what is now the Mamungari Conservation Park.

Language
The Ngalia language, also known as Ooldean, is a dialect of the Western Desert language.

Alternative names
 Nangga ('men' in the sense that they had undergone circumcision)
 Nanggaranggu
 Nanggarangku (Pitjantjatjara exonym bearing the meaning of 'hostile men')
 Ngalia, Ngalija
 Ngaliawongga
 Tangara
 Willoorara ((people of the) 'west')
 Windakan (applied to their language, and also to the Wirangu)

Source:

Notable people

Kado Muir, artist, anthropologist and politician

Notes

Citations

Sources

Aboriginal peoples of South Australia
Aboriginal peoples of Western Australia